Edward Gibbon  (8 May 173716 January 1794) was an English historian, writer, and member of parliament. His most important work, The History of the Decline and Fall of the Roman Empire, published in six volumes between 1776 and 1788, is known for the quality and irony of its prose, its use of primary sources, and its polemical criticism of organised religion.

Early life: 1737–1752
Edward Gibbon was born in 1737, the son of Edward and Judith Gibbon at Lime Grove, in the town of Putney, Surrey. He had six siblings, five brothers and one sister, all of whom died in infancy. His grandfather, also named Edward, had lost his assets as a result of the South Sea bubble stock-market collapse in 1720 but eventually regained much of his wealth. Gibbon's father was thus able to inherit a substantial estate. His paternal grandmother, Catherine Acton, was granddaughter of Sir Walter Acton, 2nd Baronet.

As a youth, Gibbon's health was under constant threat.  He described himself as "a puny child, neglected by my Mother, starved by my nurse". At age nine, he was sent to Dr. Woddeson's school at Kingston upon Thames (now Kingston Grammar School), shortly after which his mother died.  He then took up residence in the Westminster School boarding house, owned by his adored "Aunt Kitty", Catherine Porten. Soon after she died in 1786, he remembered her as rescuing him from his mother's disdain, and imparting "the first rudiments of knowledge, the first exercise of reason, and a taste for books which is still the pleasure and glory of my life". From 1747 Gibbon spent time at the family home in Buriton. By 1751, Gibbon's reading was already extensive and certainly pointed toward his future pursuits: Laurence Echard's Roman History (1713), William Howel(l)'s An Institution of General History (1680–85), and several of the 65 volumes of the acclaimed Universal History from the Earliest Account of Time (1747–1768).

Career

Oxford, Lausanne, and a religious journey: 1752–1758

Following a stay at Bath in 1752 to improve his health, at the age of 15, Gibbon was sent by his father to Magdalen College, Oxford, where he was enrolled as a gentleman-commoner. He was ill-suited, however, to the college atmosphere, and later rued his 14 months there as the "most idle and unprofitable" of his life. Because he himself says so in his autobiography, it used to be thought that his penchant for "theological controversy" (his aunt's influence) fully bloomed when he came under the spell of the deist or rationalist theologian Conyers Middleton (1683–1750), the author of Free Inquiry into the Miraculous Powers (1749). In that tract, Middleton denied the validity of such powers; Gibbon promptly objected, or so the argument used to run. The product of that disagreement, with some assistance from the work of Catholic Bishop Jacques-Bénigne Bossuet (1627–1704), and that of the Elizabethan Jesuit Robert Parsons (1546–1610), yielded the most memorable event of his time at Oxford: his conversion to Roman Catholicism on 8 June 1753.  He was further "corrupted" by the 'free thinking' deism of the playwright/poet couple David and Lucy Mallet; and finally Gibbon's father, already "in despair," had had enough. David Womersley has shown, however, that Gibbon's claim to having been converted by a reading of Middleton is very unlikely, and was introduced only into the final draft of the "Memoirs" in 1792–93. Bowersock suggests that Gibbon fabricated the Middleton story retrospectively in his anxiety about the impact of the French Revolution and Edmund Burke's claim that it was provoked by the French philosophes, so influential on Gibbon.

Within weeks of his conversion, the adolescent was removed from Oxford and sent to live under the care and tutelage of Daniel Pavillard, Reformed pastor of Lausanne, Switzerland. There, he made one of his life's two great friendships, that of Jacques Georges Deyverdun (the French-language translator of Goethe's The Sorrows of Young Werther), and that of John Baker Holroyd (later Lord Sheffield). Just a year and a half later, after his father threatened to disinherit him, on Christmas Day, 1754, he reconverted to Protestantism. "The various articles of the Romish creed," he wrote, "disappeared like a dream". He remained in Lausanne for five intellectually productive years, a period that greatly enriched Gibbon's already immense aptitude for scholarship and erudition: he read Latin literature; travelled throughout Switzerland studying its cantons' constitutions; and studied the works of Hugo Grotius, Samuel von Pufendorf, John Locke, Pierre Bayle, and Blaise Pascal.

Thwarted romance

He also met the one romance in his life: the daughter of the pastor of Crassy, a young woman named Suzanne Curchod, who was later to become the wife of Louis XVI's finance minister Jacques Necker, and the mother of Madame de Staël. The two developed a warm affinity; Gibbon proceeded to propose marriage, but ultimately this was out of the question, blocked both by his father's staunch disapproval and Curchod's equally staunch reluctance to leave Switzerland. Gibbon returned to England in August 1758 to face his father. No refusal of the elder's wishes could be allowed. Gibbon put it this way: "I sighed as a lover, I obeyed as a son." He proceeded to cut off all contact with Curchod, even as she vowed to wait for him. Their final emotional break apparently came at Ferney, France, in early 1764, though they did see each other at least one more time a year later.

First fame and the Grand tour: 1758–1765

Upon his return to England, Gibbon published his first book, Essai sur l'Étude de la Littérature in 1761, which produced an initial taste of celebrity and distinguished him, in Paris at least, as a man of letters. From 1759 to 1770, Gibbon served on active duty and in reserve with the South Hampshire Militia, his deactivation in December 1762 coinciding with the militia's dispersal at the end of the Seven Years' War. The following year, he returned, via Paris, to Lausanne, where he made the acquaintance of a "prudent worthy young man" William Guise. On 18 April 1764, he and Guise set off for Italy, crossed the Alps, and after spending the summer in Florence arrived in Rome, via Lucca, Pisa, Livorno and Siena, in early October. In his autobiography, Gibbon vividly records his rapture when he finally neared "the great object of [my] pilgrimage":

...at the distance of twenty-five years I can neither forget nor express the strong emotions which agitated my mind as I first approached and entered the eternal City.  After a sleepless night, I trod, with a lofty step the ruins of the Forum; each memorable spot where Romulus stood, or Tully spoke, or Caesar fell, was at once present to my eye; and several days of intoxication were lost or enjoyed before I could descend to a cool and minute investigation.

Here, Gibbon first conceived the idea of composing a history of the city, later extended to the entire empire, a moment he described later as his "Capitoline vision":

It was at Rome, on the fifteenth of October 1764, as I sat musing amidst the ruins of the Capitol, while the barefooted fryars were singing vespers in the temple of Jupiter, that the idea of writing the decline and fall of the City first started to my mind.

Womersley (Oxford Dictionary of National Biography, p. 12) notes the existence of "good reasons" to doubt the statement's accuracy. Elaborating, Pocock ("Classical History," ¶ #2) refers to it as a likely "creation of memory" or a "literary invention", given that Gibbon, in his autobiography, claimed that his journal dated the reminiscence to 15 October, when in fact the journal gives no date.

Late career: 1765–1776

Work
In June 1765, Gibbon returned to his father's house, and remained there until the latter's death in 1770. These five years were considered by Gibbon as the worst of his life, but he tried to remain busy by making early attempts towards writing full histories. His first historical narrative known as the History of Switzerland, which represented Gibbon's love for Switzerland, was never published nor finished. Even under the guidance of Deyverdun (a German translator for Gibbons), Gibbon became too critical of himself, and completely abandoned the project, only writing 60 pages of text. However, after Gibbon's death, his writings on Switzerland's history were discovered and published by Lord Sheffield in 1815. Soon after abandoning his History of Switzerland, Gibbon made another attempt towards completing a full history.

His second work, Memoires Litteraires de la Grande Bretagne, was a two-volume set which described the literary and social conditions of England at the time, such as Lord Lyttelton's history of Henry II and Nathaniel Lardner's The Credibility of the Gospel History. Gibbon's Memoires Litteraires failed to gain any notoriety and was considered a flop by fellow historians and literary scholars.

After he tended to his father's estate—which was by no means in good condition— quite enough remained for Gibbon to settle fashionably in London at 7 Bentinck Street, free of financial concern. By February 1773, he was writing in earnest, but not without the occasional self-imposed distraction. He took to London society quite easily, joined the better social clubs, including Dr. Johnson's Literary Club, and looked in from time to time on his friend Holroyd in Sussex. He succeeded Oliver Goldsmith at the Royal Academy as 'professor in ancient history' (honorary but prestigious). In late 1774, he was initiated as a Freemason of the Premier Grand Lodge of England.

He was also, perhaps least productively in that same year, 1774, returned to the House of Commons for Liskeard, Cornwall through the intervention of his relative and patron, Edward Eliot.  He became the archetypal back-bencher, benignly "mute" and "indifferent," his support of the Whig ministry invariably automatic. Gibbon's indolence in that position, perhaps fully intentional, subtracted little from the progress of his writing. Gibbon lost the Liskeard seat in 1780 when Eliot joined the opposition, taking with him "the Electors of Leskeard [who] are commonly of the same opinion as Mr. El[l]iot." (Murray, p. 322.) The following year, owing to the good grace of Prime Minister Lord North, he was again returned to Parliament, this time for Lymington on a by-election.

The History of the Decline and Fall of the Roman Empire: 1776–1788

After several rewrites, with Gibbon "often tempted to throw away the labours of seven years," the first volume of what was to become his life's major achievement, The History of the Decline and Fall of the Roman Empire, was published on 17 February 1776. Through 1777, the reading public eagerly consumed three editions, for which Gibbon was rewarded handsomely: two-thirds of the profits, amounting to approximately £1,000. Biographer Leslie Stephen wrote that thereafter, "His fame was as rapid as it has been lasting."  And as regards this first volume, "Some warm praise from David Hume overpaid the labour of ten years."

Volumes II and III appeared on 1 March 1781, eventually rising "to a level with the previous volume in general esteem." Volume IV was finished in June 1784; the final two were completed during a second Lausanne sojourn (September 1783 to August 1787) where Gibbon reunited with his friend Deyverdun in leisurely comfort. By early 1787, he was "straining for the goal" and with great relief the project was finished in June. Gibbon later wrote:

Volumes IV, V, and VI finally reached the press in May 1788, their publication having been delayed since March so it could coincide with a dinner party celebrating Gibbon's 51st birthday (the 8th). Mounting a bandwagon of praise for the later volumes were such contemporary luminaries as Adam Smith, William Robertson, Adam Ferguson, Lord Camden, and Horace Walpole. Adam Smith told Gibbon that "by the universal assent of every man of taste and learning, whom I either know or correspond with, it sets you at the very head of the whole literary tribe at present existing in Europe."
In November 1788, he was elected a Fellow of the Royal Society, the main proposer being his good friend Lord Sheffield.

In 1783 Gibbon had been intrigued by the cleverness of Sheffield's 12 year-old eldest daughter, Maria, and he proposed to teach her himself. Over the following years he continued, creating a girl of sixteen who was both well educated, confident and determined to choose her own husband. Gibbon described her as a "mixture of just observation and lively imagery, the strong sense of a man expressed with the easy elegance of a female".

Later life: 1789–1794

The years following Gibbon's completion of The History were filled largely with sorrow and increasing physical discomfort. He had returned to London in late 1787 to oversee the publication process alongside Lord Sheffield. With that accomplished, in 1789 it was back to Lausanne only to learn of and be "deeply affected" by the death of Deyverdun, who had willed Gibbon his home, La Grotte. He resided there with little commotion, took in the local society, received a visit from Sheffield in 1791, and "shared the common abhorrence" of the French Revolution. In 1793, word came of Lady Sheffield's death; Gibbon immediately left Lausanne and set sail to comfort a grieving but composed Sheffield. His health began to fail critically in December, and at the turn of the new year, he was on his last legs.

Among Edward Gibbon's maladies was gout. Gibbon is also believed to have suffered from an extreme case of scrotal swelling, probably a hydrocele testis, a condition which causes the scrotum to swell with fluid in a compartment overlying either testicle. In an age when close-fitting clothes were fashionable, his condition led to a chronic and disfiguring inflammation that left Gibbon a lonely figure. As his condition worsened, he underwent numerous procedures to alleviate the condition, but with no enduring success.  In early January, the last of a series of three operations caused an unremitting peritonitis to set in and spread, from which he died.

The "English giant of the Enlightenment" finally succumbed at 12:45 pm, 16 January 1794 at age 56. He was buried in the Sheffield Mausoleum attached to the north transept of the Church of St Mary and St Andrew, Fletching, East Sussex, having died in Fletching while staying with his great friend, Lord Sheffield. Gibbon's estate was valued at approximately £26,000. He left most of his property to cousins. As stipulated in his will, Sheffield oversaw the sale of his library at auction to William Beckford for £950. What happened next suggests that Beckford may have known of Gibbon's moralistic, 'impertinent animadversion' at his expense in the presence of the Duchess of Devonshire at Lausanne. Gibbon's wish that his 6,000-book library would not be locked up 'under the key of a jealous master' was effectively denied by Beckford who retained it in Lausanne until 1801 before inspecting it, then locking it up again until at least as late as 1818 before giving most of the books back to Gibbon's physician Dr Scholl who had helped negotiate the sale in the first place. Beckford's annotated copy of the Decline and Fall turned up in Christie's in 1953, complete with his critique of what he considered the author's 'ludicrous self-complacency ... your frequent distortion of historical Truth to provoke a gibe, or excite a sneer ... your ignorance of oriental languages [etc.]'.

Legacy
Edward Gibbon's central thesis in his explanation of how the Roman Empire fell, that it was due to embracing Christianity, is not widely accepted by scholars today. Gibbon argued that with the empire's new Christian character, large sums of wealth that would have otherwise been used in the secular affairs in promoting the state were transferred to promoting the activities of the Church. However, the pre-Christian empire also spent large financial sums on religious affairs and it is unclear whether or not the change of religion increased the amount of resources the empire spent on religion. Gibbon further argued that new attitudes in Christianity caused many Christians of wealth to renounce their lifestyles and enter a monastic lifestyle, and so stop participating in the support of the empire. However, while many Christians of wealth did become monastics, this paled in comparison to the participants in the imperial bureaucracy. Although Gibbon further pointed out that the importance Christianity placed on peace caused a decline in the number of people serving the military, the decline was so small as to be negligible for the army's effectiveness.

Gibbon's work has been criticised for its scathing view of Christianity as laid down in chapters XV and XVI, a situation which resulted in the banning of the book in several countries. Gibbon's alleged crime was disrespecting, and none too lightly, the character of sacred Christian doctrine, by "treat[ing] the Christian church as a phenomenon of general history, not a special case admitting supernatural explanations and disallowing criticism of its adherents". More specifically, the chapters excoriated the church for "supplanting in an unnecessarily destructive way the great culture that preceded it" and for "the outrage of [practising] religious intolerance and warfare".

Gibbon, in letters to Holroyd and others, expected some type of church-inspired backlash, but the harshness of the ensuing torrents exceeded anything he or his friends had anticipated. Contemporary detractors such as Joseph Priestley and Richard Watson stoked the nascent fire, but the most severe of these attacks was an "acrimonious" piece by the young cleric, Henry Edwards Davis.
Gibbon subsequently published his Vindication in 1779, in which he categorically denied Davis' "criminal accusations", branding him a purveyor of "servile plagiarism." Davis followed Gibbon's Vindication with yet another reply (1779).

Gibbon's apparent antagonism to Christian doctrine spilled over into the Jewish faith, leading to charges of anti-Semitism. For example, he wrote:

From the reign of Nero to that of Antoninus Pius, the Jews discovered a fierce impatience of the dominion of Rome, which repeatedly broke out in the most furious massacres and insurrections. Humanity is shocked at the recital of the horrid cruelties which they committed in the cities of Egypt, of Cyprus, and of Cyrene, where they dwelt in treacherous friendship with the unsuspecting natives; and we are tempted to applaud the severe retaliation which was exercised by the arms of legions against a race of fanatics, whose dire and credulous superstition seemed to render them the implacable enemies not only of the Roman government, but also of mankind.

Influence

Gibbon is considered to be a son of the Enlightenment and this is reflected in his famous verdict on the history of the Middle Ages: "I have described the triumph of barbarism and religion." However, politically, he aligned himself with the conservative Edmund Burke's rejection of the radical egalitarian movements of the time as well as with Burke's dismissal of overly rationalistic applications of the "rights of man".

Gibbon's work has been praised for its style, his piquant epigrams and its effective irony.  Winston Churchill memorably noted in My Early Life, "I set out upon...Gibbon's Decline and Fall of the Roman Empire [and] was immediately dominated both by the story and the style. ...I devoured Gibbon. I rode triumphantly through it from end to end and enjoyed it all." Churchill modelled much of his own literary style on Gibbon's. Like Gibbon, he dedicated himself to producing a "vivid historical narrative, ranging widely over period and place and enriched by analysis and reflection."

Unusually for the 18th century, Gibbon was never content with secondhand accounts when the primary sources were accessible (though most of these were drawn from well-known printed editions). "I have always endeavoured," he says, "to draw from the fountain-head; that my curiosity, as well as a sense of duty, has always urged me to study the originals; and that, if they have sometimes eluded my search, I have carefully marked the secondary evidence, on whose faith a passage or a fact were reduced to depend." In this insistence upon the importance of primary sources, Gibbon is considered by many to be one of the first modern historians:

In accuracy, thoroughness, lucidity, and comprehensive grasp of a vast subject, the 'History' is unsurpassable. It is the one English history which may be regarded as definitive...Whatever its shortcomings the book is artistically imposing as well as historically unimpeachable as a vast panorama of a great period.

The subject of Gibbon's writing, as well as his ideas and style, have influenced other writers. Besides his influence on Churchill, Gibbon was also a model for Isaac Asimov in his writing of The Foundation Trilogy, which he said involved "a little bit of cribbin' from the works of Edward Gibbon".

Evelyn Waugh admired Gibbon's style, but not his secular viewpoint. In Waugh's 1950 novel Helena, the early Christian author Lactantius worried about the possibility of "'a false historian, with the mind of Cicero or Tacitus and the soul of an animal,' and he nodded towards the gibbon who fretted his golden chain and chattered for fruit."

Monographs by Gibbon

 Essai sur l’Étude de la Littérature (London: Becket & De Hondt, 1761).
 Critical Observations on the Sixth Book of [Vergil's] The Aeneid (London: Elmsley, 1770).
 The History of the Decline and Fall of the Roman Empire  (vol. I, 1776; vols. II, III, 1781; vols. IV, V, VI, 1788–1789). all London: Strahan & Cadell.
 A Vindication of some passages in the fifteenth and sixteenth chapters of the History of the Decline and Fall of the Roman Empire (London: J. Dodsley, 1779).
 Mémoire Justificatif pour servir de Réponse à l’Exposé, etc. de la Cour de France (London: Harrison & Brooke, 1779).

Other writings by Gibbon

 "Lettre sur le gouvernement de Berne" [Letter No. IX. Mr. Gibbon to *** on the Government of Berne], in Miscellaneous Works, First (1796) edition, vol. 1 (below). Scholars differ on the date of its composition (Norman, D.M. Low: 1758–59; Pocock: 1763–64).
 Mémoires Littéraires de la Grande-Bretagne. co-author: Georges Deyverdun (2 vols.: vol. 1, London: Becket & De Hondt, 1767; vol. 2, London: Heydinger, 1768).
 Miscellaneous Works of Edward Gibbon, Esq., ed. John Lord Sheffield (2 vols., London: Cadell & Davies, 1796; 5 vols., London: J. Murray, 1814; 3 vols., London: J. Murray, 1815). Includes Memoirs of the Life and Writings of Edward Gibbon, Esq..
 Autobiographies of Edward Gibbon, ed. John Murray (London: J. Murray, 1896). EG's complete memoirs (six drafts) from the original manuscripts.
 The Private Letters of Edward Gibbon, 2 vols., ed. Rowland E. Prothero (London: J. Murray, 1896).
 The works of Edward Gibbon, Volume 3 1906.
 Gibbon's Journal to 28 January 1763, ed. D.M. Low (London: Chatto and Windus, 1929).
 Le Journal de Gibbon à Lausanne, ed. Georges A. Bonnard (Lausanne: Librairie de l'Université, 1945).
 Miscellanea Gibboniana, eds. G.R. de Beer, L. Junod, G.A. Bonnard (Lausanne: Librairie de l'Université, 1952).
 The Letters of Edward Gibbon, 3 vols., ed. J.E. Norton (London: Cassell & Co., 1956). vol. 1: 1750–1773; vol. 2: 1774–1784; vol. 3: 1784–1794. cited as 'Norton, Letters'.
 Gibbon's Journey from Geneva to Rome, ed. G.A. Bonnard (London: Thomas Nelson and Sons, 1961). journal.
 Edward Gibbon: Memoirs of My Life, ed. G.A. Bonnard (New York: Funk & Wagnalls, 1969; 1966). portions of EG's memoirs arranged chronologically, omitting repetition.
 The English Essays of Edward Gibbon, ed. Patricia Craddock (Oxford: Clarendon Press, 1972); hb: .

See also
 The Work of J.G.A. Pocock: Edward Gibbon section
 The History of the Decline and Fall of the Roman Empire: Further reading
 The Miscellaneous Works of Edward Gibbon
 A Gibbon chronology
 Historiography of the United Kingdom

Notes
Most of this article, including quotations unless otherwise noted, has been adapted from Stephen's entry on Edward Gibbon in the Dictionary of National Biography.

References

Sources 
 Beer, G. R. de. "The Malady of Edward Gibbon, F.R.S." Notes and Records of the Royal Society of London 7:1 (December 1949), 71–80.
 Craddock, Patricia B. Edward Gibbon, Luminous Historian 1772–1794. Baltimore: Johns Hopkins University Press, 1989. HB: . Biography.
 Dickinson, H. T. "The Politics of Edward Gibbon". Literature and History 8:4 (1978), 175–196.

 Low, D. M., Edward Gibbon. 1737–1794 (London: Chatto & Windus, 1937).
 Murray, John (ed.), The Autobiographies of Edward Gibbon. Second Edition (London: John Murray, 1897).
 Norton, J. E. A Bibliography of the Works of Edward Gibbon. New York: Burt Franklin Co., 1940, repr. 1970.
 Norton, J .E. The Letters of Edward Gibbon. 3 vols. London: Cassell & Co. Ltd., 1956.
 Pocock, J. G. A. The Enlightenments of Edward Gibbon, 1737–1764. Cambridge: Cambridge University Press, 1999. HB: .
 Pocock, J. G. A. "Classical and Civil History: The Transformation of Humanism". Cromohs 1 (1996). Online at the Università degli Studi di Firenze. Retrieved 20 November 2009.
 Pocock, J. G. A. "The Ironist". Review of David Womersley's The Watchmen of the Holy City. London Review of Books 24:22 (14 November 2002). Online at the London Review of Books (subscribers only). Retrieved 20 November 2009.
 Gibbon, Edward. Memoirs of My Life and Writings.  Online at Gutenberg. Retrieved 20 November 2009.
 Stephen, Sir Leslie, "Gibbon, Edward (1737–1794)". In the Dictionary of National Biography, eds. Sir Leslie Stephen and Sir Sidney Lee. Oxford: 1921, repr. 1963. Vol. 7, 1129–1135.
 Womersley, David, ed. The History of the Decline and Fall of the Roman Empire. 3 vols. (London and New York: Penguin, 1994).
 Womersley, David. "Introduction," in Womersley, Decline and Fall, vol. 1, xi–cvi.
 Womersley, David. "Gibbon, Edward (1737–1794)". In the Oxford Dictionary of National Biography, eds. H.C.G. Matthew and  Brian Harrison. Oxford: Oxford University Press, 2004. Vol. 22, 8–18.

Further reading

Before 1985
 Barlow, J. W. (1879). “Gibbon and Julian”. In: Hermathena, Volume 3, 142–159. Dublin: Edward Posonby.
 Beer, Gavin de. Gibbon and His World. London: Thames and Hudson, 1968. HB: .
 Bowersock, G. W., et al. eds. Edward Gibbon and the Decline and Fall of the Roman Empire. Cambridge, MA: Harvard University Press, 1977.
 Craddock, Patricia B. Young Edward Gibbon: Gentleman of Letters. Baltimore, MD: Johns Hopkins University Press, 1982. HB: . Biography.
 Jordan, David. Gibbon and his Roman Empire. Urbana, IL: University of Illinois Press, 1971.
 Keynes, Geoffrey, ed. The Library of Edward Gibbon. 2nd ed.  Godalming, England: St. Paul's Bibliographies, 1940, repr. 1980.
 Lewis, Bernard. "Gibbon on Muhammad". Daedalus 105:3 (Summer 1976), 89–101.
 Low, D. M. Edward Gibbon 1737–1794. London: Chatto and Windus, 1937. Biography.
 Momigliano, Arnaldo. "Gibbon's Contributions to Historical Method". Historia 2 (1954), 450–463. Reprinted in Momigliano, Studies in Historiography (New York: Harper & Row, 1966; Garland Pubs., 1985), 40–55. PB: .
 Porter, Roger J. "Gibbon's Autobiography: Filling Up the Silent Vacancy". Eighteenth-Century Studies 8:1 (Autumn 1974), 1–26.
 Stephen, Leslie, "Gibbon's Autobiography" in Studies of a Biographer, Vol. 1 (1898)
 Swain, J. W. Edward Gibbon the Historian. New York: St. Martin's Press, 1966.
 
 White, Jr. Lynn, ed. The Transformation of the Roman World: Gibbon's Problem after Two Centuries. Berkeley: University of California Press, 1966. HB: .

Since 1985
 Berghahn, C.-F., and T. Kinzel, eds., Edward Gibbon im deutschen Sprachraum. Bausteine einer Rezeptionsgeschichte. Heidelberg: Universitätsverlag Winter, 2015.
 Bowersock, G. W. Gibbon's Historical Imagination. Stanford: Stanford University Press, 1988.
 Burrow, J. W. Gibbon (Past Masters). Oxford: Oxford University Press, 1985. HB: . PB: .
 Carnochan, W. Bliss. Gibbon's Solitude: The Inward World of the Historian. Stanford: Stanford University Press, 1987. HB: .
 Chaney, Edward, "Reiseerlebnis und 'Traumdeutung' bei Edward Gibbon und William Beckford", Europareisen politisch-sozialer Eliten im 18.Jahrhundert, eds. J. Rees, W. Siebers and H. Tilgner (Berlin 2002), pp. 243–60. 
 Chaney, Edward, "Gibbon, Beckford and the Interpretation of Dreams, Waking Thoughts, and Incidents", The Beckford Society Annual Lectures 2000-2003, ed. Jon Millinton (Beckford Society, 2004).
 Craddock, Patricia B. Edward Gibbon: a Reference Guide. Boston: G. K. Hall, 1987. PB: . A comprehensive listing of secondary literature through 1985. See also her supplement covering the period through 1997.
 Ghosh, Peter R. "Gibbon Observed". Journal of Roman Studies 81 (1991), 132–156.
 Ghosh, Peter R. "Gibbon's First Thoughts: Rome, Christianity and the Essai sur l'Étude de la Litterature 1758–61". Journal of Roman Studies 85 (1995), 148–164.
 Ghosh, Peter R. "The Conception of Gibbon's History", in McKitterick and Quinault, eds. Edward Gibbon and Empire, 271–316.
 Ghosh, Peter R. "Gibbon's Timeless Verity: Nature and Neo-Classicism in the Late Enlightenment," in Womersley, Burrow, Pocock, eds. Edward Gibbon: bicentenary essays.
 Ghosh, Peter R. "Gibbon, Edward 1737–1794 British historian of Rome and universal historian," in Kelly Boyd, ed. Encyclopedia of Historians and Historical Writing (Chicago: Fitzroy Dearborn, 1999), 461–463.
 Kapossy, Béla, Lovis, Béatrice (dir.), Edward Gibbon et Lausanne. Le Pays de Vaud à la rencontre des Lumières européennes. Gollion: Infolio, 2022, 528 p.
 Levine, Joseph M., "Edward Gibbon and the Quarrel between the Ancients and the Moderns," in Levine, Humanism and History: origins of modern English historiography (Ithaca, NY: Cornell University Press, 1987).
 Levine, Joseph M. "Truth and Method in Gibbon's Historiography," in Levine, The Autonomy of History: truth and method from Erasmus to Gibbon (Chicago: Chicago University Press, 1999).
 McKitterick, R., and R. Quinault, eds. Edward Gibbon and Empire. Cambridge: Cambridge University Press, 1997.
 Norman, Brian.  "The Influence of Switzerland on the Life and Writings of Edward Gibbon," in Studies on Voltaire and the Eighteenth Century [SVEC] v.2002:03. Oxford: Voltaire Foundation, 2002.
 O'Brien, Karen.
 Pocock, J. G. A. Barbarism and Religion, 4 vols.: vol. 1, The Enlightenments of Edward Gibbon, 1737–1764, 1999 [hb: ]; vol. 2, Narratives of Civil Government, 1999 [hb: ]; vol. 3, The First Decline and Fall, 2003 [pb: ]; vol. 4, Barbarians, Savages and Empires, 2005 [pb: ]. all Cambridge Univ. Press.
 Porter, Roy. Gibbon: Making History. New York: St. Martin's Press, 1989, HB: .
 Turnbull, Paul. "'Une marionnette infidele': the Fashioning of Edward Gibbon's Reputation as the English Voltaire," in Womersley, Burrow, Pocock, eds. Edward Gibbon: bicentenary essays.
 Womersley, David P. The Transformation of The Decline and Fall of the Roman Empire. Cambridge: Cambridge University Press, 1988. HB: .
 Womersley, David P.,  John Burrow, and J. G. A. Pocock, eds. Edward Gibbon: bicentenary essays. Oxford: Voltaire Foundation, 1997. HB: .
 Womersley, David P. Gibbon and the ‘Watchmen of the Holy City’: The Historian and His Reputation, 1776–1815. Oxford: Oxford University Press, 2002. PB: .

External links

 
 
 
 
 
 Edward Gibbon, Historian of the Roman Empire. Part 1: The Man and his Book
 Edward Gibbon, Historian of the Roman Empire. Part 2: A closer look at The Decline and Fall Archive link
 DeclineandFallResources.com – Original Maps and Footnote Translations
 Biographer Patricia Craddock's comprehensive bibliography through May 1999.
 Craddock's supplement to her Reference Guide.

1737 births
1794 deaths
18th-century diarists
18th-century English historians
18th-century English male writers
18th-century English non-fiction writers
Edward
Alumni of Magdalen College, Oxford
British book and manuscript collectors
British Byzantinists
British Freemasons
British historians of religion
British male essayists
British monarchists
British MPs 1774–1780
British MPs 1780–1784
British Protestants
British rhetoricians
Burials in Sussex
Converts to Protestantism from Catholicism
Critics of religions
Deaths from peritonitis
English book and manuscript collectors
English classical scholars
English essayists
English male non-fiction writers
English Protestants
English rhetoricians
Fellows of the Royal Society
Freemasons of the Premier Grand Lodge of England
Historians of ancient Rome
Historians of Christianity
Irony theorists
Members of the Parliament of Great Britain for constituencies in Cornwall
Members of the Parliament of Great Britain for English constituencies
People educated at Kingston Grammar School
People educated at Westminster School, London
People from Buriton
People from Putney
Rhetoric theorists
Theorists on Western civilization